The Translational Research Institute (TRI) is Australia's first translational medical research institute dedicated to translating scientific discoveries into applications for medical practice.

TRI is a Pty Ltd. company with four shareholders: Queensland Health,
the Queensland University of Technology, The University of Queensland and Mater Medical Research.

History 
In 2004 a proposal was submitted to the Queensland Government for the development and construction of TRI. In 2007 this progressed to project design. Five years on and 354 million in funding from the Australian and Queensland Governments, UQ and QUT, TRI became operational and four institutes came together. TRI was established in January 2013 and officially opened in October of the same year by the Governor-General Dame Quentin Bryce.

Research 
Over 800 researchers and clinicians from TRI’s four shareholders undertake medical research and clinical studies into cancer; inflammation and infection; obesity and diabetes; kidney disease and liver disease; and bone and joint disorders.

TRI research aims to:
 prevent disease and provide protection against infection,
 understand diseases to improve early detection, diagnosis, treatment and recovery,
 reduce the risk of disease spreading,
 relieve symptoms and better manage chronic diseases and trauma.

Researchers 
Some of TRI's researchers include:
 Professor Ian Frazer - known for the development of the HPV vaccine against cervical cancer.
 Associate Professor Glenda Gobe - Co-director, renal atrophy and regeneration, fibrosis, immunity and inflammation, and kidney cancer.
 Professor Judith Clements - known for Kallikrein proteases in prostate and ovarian cancers.
 Professor Josephine Forbes - specialises in the study of glycation and diabetes.
 Professor David Johnson – known for kidney treatments and transplants.
 Professor Scott Bell - Current TRI CEO, renowned respiratory specialist.

Facilities 
Located on the Princess Alexandra (PA) Hospital campus, the seven-story TRI building incorporates four floors of laboratories; and facilities for research support, administration and teaching.

TRI’s core facilities include:
 Clinical Research Facilities
 Cytometry Core Facility
 Histology Core Facility
 Microscopy Core Facility
 Proteomics Facility

Co-located with TRI are the following facilities:
 Patheon Biologics, the first major biopharmaceutical manufacturing facility in Australia.
 The Pharmacy Australian Centre of Excellence (PACE) 
 Brisbane Diamantina Health Partners, an academic health science system

The TRI building 
The TRI building was designed by Wilson Architects + Donovan Hill and was built by Watpac, completed in 2012 at the total cost of $354 million. The facility features eight levels: four levels of laboratories, administration and teaching facilities, an auditorium and conference rooms, staff amenities and an "outdoor room" atrium area. TRI is a  building. It stands on the grounds of the Princess Alexandra Hospital in Brisbane on the former site of the Vision Australia building, of which the red clay bricks were salvaged and reused as the base of TRI.

The building received several architectural and design awards.

See also

 Health in Australia

References 

2013 establishments in Australia
Translational Research Institute
Multidisciplinary research institutes
Queensland University of Technology
Research institutes established in 2013
Translational medicine
University of Queensland